Suntop or Sun Top may refer to:

Places
 Suntop Homes, a series of Usonian houses in Ardmore, Pennsylvania by Frank Lloyd Wright
 Suntop Lookout, a fire lookout tower near Mount Rainier on Washington State, USA.

Characters
 Suntop, a character in the comic book series Elfquest, later called Sunstream.

Products
 Sun Top, a juice drink manufactured by Co-Ro Food
 Suntop Island, a TV series broadcast on Spacetoon in Saudi Arabia, related to the juice drink.
 Sun top, a type of clothing top that protects the wearer from sunlight.
 Sun top, another name for a Bimini top, an open-front canvas top on a metal frame for the cockpit of a jeep or a boat. 
 Suntop, a camera lens from Pentax

Other uses
 Suntop Media Ltd., a training and consulting company founded by Des Dearlove